Marielena Davila (born May 3, 1992 in Caracas, Venezuela), is a Venezuelan actress and singer. She is the daughter of Venezuelan actress Chiquinquirá Delgado and the actor Guillermo Dávila.

Filmography

Telenovelas

Discography
Singles

References

External links 

Venezuelan telenovela actresses
Living people
Actresses from Caracas
21st-century Venezuelan women singers
21st-century Venezuelan actresses
Singers from Caracas
1992 births